The price-earnings ratio, also known as P/E ratio, P/E, or PER, is the ratio of a company's share (stock) price to the company's earnings per share. The ratio is used for valuing companies and to find out whether they are overvalued or undervalued. 

Put another way, the purchaser of the share is investing  for every dollar of annual earnings; or, if earnings stayed constant it would take 8 years to recoup the share price. Companies with losses (negative earnings) or no profit have an undefined P/E ratio (usually shown as "not applicable" or "N/A"); sometimes, however, a negative P/E ratio may be shown.

Versions

There are multiple versions of the P/E ratio, depending on whether earnings are projected or realized, and the type of earnings.
 "Trailing P/E" uses the weighted average share price of common shares in issue divided by the net income for the most recent 12-month period. This is the most common meaning of "P/E" if no other qualifier is specified. Monthly earnings data for individual companies are not available, and in any case usually fluctuate seasonally, so the previous four quarterly earnings reports are used and earnings per share are updated quarterly. Note, each company chooses its own financial year so the timing of updates varies from one to another.
 "Trailing P/E from continued operations" uses operating earnings, which exclude earnings from discontinued operations, extraordinary items (e.g. one-off windfalls and write-downs), and accounting changes.
 "Forward P/E": Instead of net income, this uses estimated net earnings over next 12 months. Estimates are typically derived as the mean of those published by a select group of analysts (selection criteria are rarely cited).

Some people mistakenly use the formula  to calculate the P/E ratio.

Variations on the standard trailing and forward P/E ratios are common. Generally, alternative P/E measures substitute different measures of earnings, such as rolling averages over longer periods of time (to attempt to "smooth" volatile or cyclical earnings, for example), or "corrected" earnings figures that exclude certain extraordinary events or one-off gains or losses. The definitions may not be standardized. For companies that are loss-making, or whose earnings are expected to change dramatically, a "primary" P/E can be used instead, based on the earnings projections made for the next years to which a discount calculation is applied.

Interpretation

As the ratio of a stock (share price) to a flow (earnings per share), the P/E ratio has the units of time. It can be interpreted as the amount of time over which the company would need to sustain its current earnings in order to make enough money to pay back the current share price. While the P/E ratio can in principle be given in terms of any time unit, in practice it is essentially always implicitly reported in years, with the unit of "years" rarely indicated explicitly. (This is the convention followed in this article.)

The price/earnings ratio (PER) is the most widely used method for determining whether shares are "correctly" valued in relation to one another. But the PER does not in itself indicate whether the share is a bargain. The PER depends on the market’s perception of the risk and future growth in earnings. A company with a low PER indicates that the market perceives it as higher risk or lower growth or both as compared to a company with a higher PER. The PER of a listed company’s share is the result of the collective perception of the market as to how risky the company is and what its earnings growth prospects are in relation to that of other companies. Investors use the PER to compare their own perception of the risk and growth of a company against the market’s collective perception of the risk and growth as reflected in the current PER. If investors believe that their perception is superior to that of the market, they can make the decision to buy or sell accordingly.

Historical P/E ratios for the U.S. stock market

Since 1900, the average P/E ratio for the S&P 500 index has ranged from 4.78 in Dec 1920 to 44.20 in Dec 1999. However, except for some brief periods, during 1920–1990 the market P/E ratio was mostly between 10 and 20.

The average P/E of the market varies in relation with, among other factors, expected growth of earnings, expected stability of earnings, expected inflation, and yields of competing investments.  For example, when U.S. treasury bonds yield high returns, investors pay less for a given earnings per share and P/E's fall.

The average U.S. equity P/E ratio from 1900 to 2005 is 14 (or 16, depending on whether the geometric mean or the arithmetic mean, respectively, is used to average).

Jeremy Siegel has suggested that the average P/E ratio of about 15  (or earnings yield of about 6.6%) arises due to the long term returns for stocks of about 6.8%. In Stocks for the Long Run, (2002 edition) he had argued that with favorable developments like the lower capital gains tax rates and transaction costs, P/E ratio in "low twenties" is sustainable, despite being higher than the historic average.

Set out below are the recent year end values of the S&P 500 index and the associated P/E as reported. For a list of recent contractions (recessions) and expansions see U.S. Business Cycle Expansions and Contractions.

Note that at the height of the Dot-com bubble P/E had risen to 32. The collapse in earnings caused P/E to rise to 46.50 in 2001. It has declined to a more sustainable region of 17. Its decline in recent years has been due to higher earnings growth.

Due to the collapse in earnings and rapid stock market recovery following the 2020 Coronavirus Crash, the Trailing P/E ratio reached 38.3 on October 12, 2020. This elevated level was only attained twice in history, 2001-2002 and 2008-2009.

In business culture 
The P/E ratio of a company is a major focus for many managers. They are usually paid in company stock or options on their company's stock (a form of payment that is supposed to align the interests of management with the interests of other stock holders). The stock price can increase in one of two ways: either through improved earnings or through an improved multiple that the market assigns to those earnings. In turn, the primary drivers for multiples such as the P/E ratio is through higher and more sustained earnings growth rates.

Consequently, managers have strong incentives to boost earnings per share, even in the short term, and/or improve long term growth rates. This can influence business decisions in several ways:
 If a company wants to acquire companies with a higher P/E ratio than its own, it usually prefers paying in cash or debt rather than in stock. Though in theory the method of payment makes no difference to value, doing it this way offsets or avoids earnings dilution (see accretion/dilution analysis).
 Conversely, companies with higher P/E ratios than their targets are more tempted to use their stock to pay for acquisitions.
 Companies with high P/E ratios but volatile earnings may be tempted to find ways to smooth earnings and diversify risk—this is the theory behind building conglomerates.
 Conversely, companies with low P/E ratios may be tempted to acquire small high growth businesses in an effort to "rebrand" their portfolio of activities and burnish their image as growth stocks and thus obtain a higher PE rating.
 Companies try to smooth earnings, for example by "slush fund accounting" (hiding excess earnings in good years to cover for losses in lean years). Such measures are designed to create the image that the company always slowly but steadily increases profits, with the goal to increase the P/E ratio.
 Companies with low P/E ratios are usually more open to leveraging their balance sheet. As seen above, this mechanically lowers the P/E ratio, which means the company looks cheaper than it did before leverage, and also improves earnings growth rates. Both of these factors help drive up the share price.
 Strictly speaking, the ratio is measured in years, since the price is measured in dollars and earnings are measured in dollars per year. Therefore, the ratio demonstrates how many years it takes to cover the price, if earnings stay the same.

Investor expectations 
In general, a high Price-Earning ratio indicates that investors are expecting higher growth of company's earnings in the future compared to companies with a lower Price-Earning ratio. A low Price-Earning ratio may indicate either that a company may currently be undervalued or that the company is doing exceptionally well relative to its past trends. The price-to-earnings ratio can also be seen as a means of standardizing the value of one dollar of earnings throughout the stock market. In theory, by taking the median of P/E ratios over a period of several years, one could formulate something of a standardized P/E ratio, which could then be seen as a benchmark and used to indicate whether or not a stock is worth buying. In private equity, the extrapolation of past performance is driven by stale investments. State and local governments that are more fiscally stressed by higher unfunded pension liabilities assume higher portfolio returns through higher inflation assumptions, but this factor does not attenuate the extrapolative effects of past returns.

Negative Earnings 
When a company has no earnings or is posting losses, in both cases P/E will be expressed as “N/A.” Though it is possible to calculate a negative P/E, this is not the common convention.

Related measures
 Cyclically adjusted price-to-earnings ratio
 Price-to-earnings-growth ratio
 PVGO
 Price-to-dividend ratio
 Return on investment
 Social earnings ratio
 EV/Ebitda
 Earnings yield – The inverse of price earnings ratio.

See also

 Cyclically adjusted price-to-earnings ratio
 Fundamental analysis
 Index of accounting articles
 Outline of economics
 Market value
 Price–sales ratio
 Stock market bubble
 Stock market crash
 Stock valuation using discounted cash flows
 Value investing
 Valuation using multiples

References

External links

Financial ratios